Simon George Warrender DSC (11 August 1922 – 8 May 2011) was a Royal Navy officer and businessman. He was decorated for his actions in World War II, and immigrated to Australia after the war's end, when he was involved in the aviation industry. He married into the Myer family, and he and his wife were prominent on the Melbourne social scene.

Early life
Warrender was the second son of Victor Warrender and the former Dorothy Rawson (daughter of Richard Rawson). He was born at his parents' house in Mayfair; his father was a Conservative Party politician, and in 1942 was raised to the peerage as Baron Bruntisfield. His godfather was Harold Alexander, 1st Earl Alexander of Tunis. Warrender grew up at Exton Hall in Rutland, and attended Ludgrove School and Eton College, where he displayed a talent for fencing.

Naval career
In 1939, Warrender joined the Royal Naval Volunteer Reserve on a whim, despite his parents' objections. He commanded a flotilla of boats in the Battle of Madagascar, and later took part in relieving the Siege of Malta. In 1943, Warrender transferred to the destroyer , which formed part of an Arctic convoy for the following two years. He was Savage'''s torpedo control officer during the Battle of the North Cape, and helped sink the German battleship Scharnhorst, for which he was awarded the Distinguish Service Cross (DSC). In 1944, Warrender was posted to Melbourne, Australia, as a flag lieutenant to help prepare for the arrival of the British Pacific Fleet. Towards the end of the war he was stationed in Hong Kong, where he helped relieve the POW camp at Sham Shui Po and re-establish British administration.

Australia
Warrender took flying after returning to civilian life, and in 1949 resolved to fly to Australia. His flight, in a single-engine Percival Proctor, took 34 days and was widely reported upon by Australian newspapers. It was a marketing stunt for his aircraft company, Sponson Developments. In June 1950, Warrender married Pamela Myer, the daughter of businessman Sir Norman Myer. The wedding in London was attended by many leading members of the aristocracy, as well as three members of the Royal Family. They decided to settle in Melbourne, where Warrender set up as an insurance broker. The couple also imported four toy poodles from London, making them among the first breeders in Australia.

Warrender and his wife became a fixture on the Melbourne social scene, and counted several other noteworthies among their friends, including future prime minister Harold Holt. He became an Australian citizen in 1967. He was a member of the exclusive Melbourne Club, but resigned his membership in 1971 to protest the alleged exclusion of Jewish members of his wife's family; he was the first person to resign in the club's history. In 1973, Warrender published an autobiography, Scores of Years''; the foreword was written by Jim Cairns. He returned to the aviation industry in later life, helping Freddie Laker in his unsuccessful attempt to break into the Australian market in the 1970s and later chaired Australia World Airways, which purported to be a competitor for Qantas but never went into operation. Warrender died on 8 May 2011. He and his wife had divorced in 1986, but remained close.

References

1922 births
2011 deaths
Royal Navy officers of World War II
Recipients of the Distinguished Service Cross (United Kingdom)
British emigrants to Australia
People educated at Eton College
Younger sons of barons
Businesspeople in aviation
Naturalised citizens of Australia
Royal Naval Volunteer Reserve personnel of World War II
People educated at Ludgrove School